The Turbasli culture - archaeological culture 5th-7th centuries b.c., it is located on the left bank of the middle reaches of the Belaya River, between the mouths of Sim and Chermasan. Opened by N.A.Mazhitov in 1957-1958. Materials excavation: New Turbasli settlement, burial mound in the Blagoveshchensky District, Republic of Bashkortostan etc.

Origin the population of Turbasli culture
V.F.Gening, R.D.Goldin noted Ugric population components in materials of Turbasli culture and link them to the Ural came with Ugrians from Western Siberia and South.

Other archaeologists, anthropologists, relying on established Caucasoid  type of Turbasli's population and the similarity of many elements of their culture with the culture of the nomads of the steppes of Eastern European, considers that the origin of Turbasli population associated with the latest Alans (A.Kh.Pshenichnyuk, F.A.Sungatov).

E.P.Kazakov and B.A.Muratov were noted  that the  population of Turbasli archaeological culture by ethnic origin were Chionites.

N.A.Mazhitov considers that the population of Turbasli culture were ancestors of the ancient Bashkirs.

References

Iron Age cultures
History of Ural